Harry William Burton (18 March 1887 – 31 August 1972) was an Australian rules footballer who played with Richmond in the Victorian Football League (VFL).

Notes

External links 

1887 births
1972 deaths
Australian rules footballers from Victoria (Australia)
Richmond Football Club players